The Shoen Library was a library on the now defunct Marylhurst University campus, in Marylhurst, Oregon, United States. The building was completed in 1968.

The library's construction was funded by Sam Shoen Sr., in commemoration of his late wife, Anna Mary Carty Shoen, who attended the university.

The university closed in late 2018.

See also
 List of libraries in Oregon

References

External links
 
 

1968 establishments in Oregon
Libraries in Oregon
Library buildings completed in 1968
Marylhurst University
University and college academic libraries in the United States